(born March 15, 1973) is a Japanese mixed martial artist and professional wrestler, competing in the light heavyweight division who fought most of his career in Fighting Network RINGS (RINGS). As a professional wrestler, he notably competed in New Japan Pro Wrestling (NJPW) and All Japan Pro Wrestling (AJPW). In MMA, Naruse was the first and only RINGS Light-Heavyweight Champion and a former IWGP Junior Heavyweight Champion in professional wrestling.

Mixed martial arts career
Naruse started practising shotokan karate in high school before turning his attention to puroresu. He was eventually accepted in Fighting Network RINGS and trained under his chairman Akira Maeda.

Fighting Network RINGS
A longtime competitor in RINGS before the organization began hosting true MMA bouts, Naruse had his first taste of MMA during his early career in mixed-style fights. He had his first shoot fight against submission wrestler Koichiro Kimura which he won via ankle lock. He then had another special shoot fight against kickboxer Atsushi Tamaki which went on for 24 minutes before Naruse emerged the winner via TKO due to lost points. They then had a rematch two months later which Naruse won again, this time via arm triangle choke.

Naruse experienced little success early in his mixed martial arts career, dropping six of his first seven mixed martial arts bouts, including fights against Valentijn Overeem and Magomedkhan Gamzatkhanov (commonly referred to by his nickname Volk Han).

He turned things around as a participant in the eight-man Light Heavyweight title tournament in 1997, defeating Lee Hasdell, Wataru Sakata and Chris Haseman en route to becoming the first RINGS Light Heavyweight Champion. He then went 3–6 over his next nine fights before RINGS dissolved in 2002.

After RINGS
After wrestling for New Japan Pro-Wrestling (NJPW), Naruse decided to go back to competing in MMA. On December 31, 2003, he defeated Jan Nortje by rear-naked choke at K-1 PREMIUM 2003 Dynamite!!. He then defeated Tommy Williams via armbar at Jungle Fight 3 in Brazil.

Return to MMA
Nine years after retiring in 2004, Naruse returned to MMA on October 27, 2013, as he lost to Sanae Kikuta via armbar at Grabaka Live! 3. Naruse then faced Japanese MMA legend Yuki Kondo at Pancrase: 257 on March 30, 2014. He lost the fight via majority decision.

Professional wrestling career

Fighting Network RINGS
Naruse debuted for Fighting Network RINGS in 1992 where he was billed as a scrappy junior heavyweight. Among the wrestlers he took on during the organization's puroresu days include Heavyweight wrestler Yoshihisa Yamomoto, kickboxer Nobuaki Kakuta, UFC 10 participant  Dieseul Berto, Volk Han, MMA veteran Satoshi Honma and future tag team partner Mitsuya Nagai.

Naruse and other RINGS wrestlers made the transition to mixed martial arts with the promotion in 1995.

New Japan Pro-Wrestling
In 2001 with RINGS on the verge of collapse, he moved to New Japan Pro-Wrestling. It was a well timed move as owner Antonio Inoki was giving former MMA fighters immediate pushes & he was immediately placed into a feud with Minoru Tanaka, who used to work for BattlARTS, RINGS' rival promotion. Within 4 months of his debut, Naruse captured the IWGP Junior Heavyweight Championship from his rival Tanaka.

He fought for NJPW from 2001 to 2006, defending his Junior Heavyweight title against Shinya Makabe and El Samurai before losing his belt to Tokimitsu Ishizawa, later Kendo Kashin. His next chance at the title was as one of 11 competitors in a Battle Royal on October 13, 2003 which as won by Jado.

Naruse paired with Mitsuya Nagai to win the All Asia Tag Team Championship on July 26, 2004 against Genichiro Tenryu and Masanobu Fuchi. They defended the belt three times before losing to Barry Buchanan and Rico Constantino on February 2, 2005.

His last bout came on January 8, 2006 against Takashi Iizuka, his 375th career match for New Japan Pro-Wrestling.

Championships and accomplishments

Professional wrestling
All Japan Pro Wrestling
All Asia Tag Team Championship (1 time) – with Mitsuya Nagai

New Japan Pro-Wrestling
IWGP Junior Heavyweight Championship (1 time)
G1 Jr. Six Man Tag Team Tournament (2001) – with Minoru Tanaka and Masahito Kakihara

Mixed martial arts
Fighting Network RINGS
First and only RINGS Light Heavyweight Champion

Mixed martial arts record

|-
| Loss
| align=center| 9–14
| Yuki Kondo
| Decision (majority)
| Pancrase: 257
| 
| align=center| 2
| align=center| 5:00
| Yokohama, Kanagawa, Japan
|
|-
| Loss
| align=center| 9–13
| Sanae Kikuta
| Submission (armbar)
| Grabaka: Grabaka Live! 3
| 
| align=center| 1
| align=center| 2:25
| Tokyo, Japan
|
|-
| Win
| align=center| 9–12
| Tony Williams
| Submission (armbar)
| Jungle Fight 3
| 
| align=center| 1
| align=center| 3:21
| Manaus, Brazil
| 
|-
| Win
| align=center| 8–12
| Jan Nortje
| Submission (rear-naked choke)
| K-1 PREMIUM 2003 Dynamite!!
| 
| align=center| 1
| align=center| 4:40
| Nagoya, Japan
| 
|-
| Win
| align=center| 7–12
| Ricardo Fyeet
| Submission (toe hold)
| Rings: Battle Genesis Vol. 7
| 
| align=center| 1
| align=center| 3:46
| Tokyo, Japan
| 
|-
| Loss
| align=center| 6–12
| Hiromitsu Kanehara
| Decision (unanimous)
| Rings: Rise 4th
| 
| align=center| 3
| align=center| 10:00
| Tokyo, Japan
| 
|-
| Loss
| align=center| 6–11
| Magomedkhan Gamzatkhanov
| Submission (armbar)
| Rings: Rise 3rd
| 
| align=center| 1
| align=center| 4:26
| Tokyo, Japan
| 
|-
| Loss
| align=center| 6–10
| Chris Haseman
| Submission (kimura)
| Rings: Rise 2nd
| 
| align=center| 1
| align=center| 8:18
| Osaka, Japan
| 
|-
| Win
| align=center| 6–9
| Dave van der Veen
| Submission (achilles lock)
| Rings: Rise 1st
| 
| align=center| 1
| align=center| 7:36
| Tokyo, Japan
| 
|-
| Loss
| align=center| 5–9
| Joop Kasteel
| TKO
| Rings: World Mega Battle Tournament
| 
| align=center| 1
| align=center| 8:33
| Fukuoka, Japan
| 
|-
| Win
| align=center| 5–8
| Kenichi Yamamoto
| Submission
| Rings: Fourth Fighting Integration
| 
| align=center| 1
| align=center| 11:07
| Tokyo, Japan
| 
|-
| Loss
| align=center| 4–8
| Mikhail Ilyukhin
| Submission (ankle lock)
| Rings: Third Fighting Integration
| 
| align=center| 1
| align=center| 13:52
| Tokyo, Japan
| 
|-
| Loss
| align=center| 4–7
| Mikhail Ilyukhin
| Submission (ankle lock)
| Rings – Mega Battle Tournament 1997 Semifinal 1
| 
| align=center| 1
| align=center| 12:28
| Tokyo, Japan
| 
|-
| Win
| align=center| 4–6
| Chris Haseman
| TKO
| Rings: Extension Fighting 6
| 
| align=center| 1
| align=center| 14:26
| Kagoshima, Japan
| Wins Rings Light Heavyweight Title. Title later dissolved.
|-
| Win
| align=center| 3–6
| Wataru Sakata
| Submission
| Rings: Extension Fighting 5
| 
| align=center| 1
| align=center| 5:55
| Osaka, Japan
| Semifinals of Light Heavyweight Title Tournament.
|-
| Win
| align=center| 2–6
| Lee Hasdell
| Submission
|  Rings – Extension Fighting 4
| 
| align=center| 1
| align=center| 12:58
| Tokyo, Japan
| Quarterfinals of Light Heavyweight Title Tournament.
|-
| Loss
| align=center| 1–6
| Yoshihisa Yamamoto
| Submission (armbar)
| Rings – Extension Fighting 2
| 
| align=center| 1
| align=center| 21:20
| Osaka, Japan
| 
|-
| Loss
| align=center| 1–5
| Valentijn Overeem
| TKO (cut)
|  Rings Holland – The Final Challenge
|  
| align=center| 1
| align=center| 3:58
| Amsterdam, Holland
| 
|-
| Loss
| align=center| 1–4
| Zaza Tkeshelashvili
| N/A
| Rings – Budokan Hall 1997
| 
| align=center| N/A
| align=center| N/A
| Tokyo, Japan
| 
|-
| Loss
| align=center| 1–3
| Magomedkhan Gamzatkhanov
| N/A
| Rings – Battle Dimensions Tournament 1996 Opening Round
| 
| align=center| N/A
| align=center| N/A
| Nagoya, Japan
| 
|-
| Win
| align=center| 1–2
| Egan Inoue
| Disqualification
| Rings – Maelstrom 6
| 
| align=center| 1
| align=center| 11:51
| Tokyo, Japan
| 
|-
| Loss
| align=center| 0–2
| Willie Peeters
| Decision (unanimous)
| Rings Holland – Free Fight
| 
| align=center| 1
| align=center| 10:00
| Amsterdam, Holland
| 
|-
| Loss
| align=center| 0–1
| Satir Gotchev
| N/A
| Rings – Budokan Hall 1995
| 
| align=center| N/A
| align=center| N/A
| Tokyo, Japan
|

Mixed rules 

| Win
|align=center| 3-0
| Atsushi Tamaki
| Submission (arm triangle choke)
| Rings Korakuen Experimental League 1993 Round 3
| 
|align=center| 1
|align=center| 8:39
| Tokyo, Japan
|-
| Win
|align=center| 2-0
| Atsushi Tamaki
| TKO (lost points)
| Rings Korakuen Experimental League 1993 Round 2
| 
|align=center| 1
|align=center| 24:22
| Tokyo, Japan
|-
| Win
|align=center| 1-0
| Koichiro Kimura
| Submission (ankle lock)
| Rings Mega Battle Special: Foundation
| 
|align=center| 1
|align=center| 9:39
| Yokohama, Japan

References

External links

New Fighting Network RINGS Homepage

1973 births
Sportspeople from Tokyo
Japanese male professional wrestlers
Japanese male karateka
Japanese male mixed martial artists
Mixed martial artists utilizing Shotokan
Mixed martial artists utilizing shootfighting
Mixed martial artists utilizing wrestling
Living people
IWGP Junior Heavyweight champions
All Asia Tag Team Champions